Sebastiano Roberti or Settimio Vittori (1573–1668) was a Roman Catholic prelate who served as Bishop of Tricarico (1609–1611).

Biography
Sebastiano Roberti was born in 1573.
On 11 Mar 1609, he was appointed during the papacy of Pope Paul V as Bishop of Tricarico.
On 19 Mar 1609, he was consecrated bishop by Giambattista Leni, Bishop of Mileto, with Giuseppe de Rossi, Archbishop of Acerenza e Matera, and Domenico Rivarola, Bishop of Aleria, serving as co-consecrators. 
He served as Bishop of Tricarico until his resignation in 1611. 
He died on 19 Dec 1668.

References

External links and additional sources
 (for Chronology of Bishops) 
 (for Chronology of Bishops) 

17th-century Italian Roman Catholic bishops
Bishops appointed by Pope Paul V
1573 births
1668 deaths